Winston Silcott (born 1959), a British citizen of Caribbean (Montserrat) parents, was wrongfully convicted in March 1987, as one of the "Tottenham Three", for the murder of PC Keith Blakelock on the night of 6 October 1985 during the Broadwater Farm riot in north London – despite not having been near the scene. The convictions of all three individuals were quashed on 25 November 1991 after scientific tests suggested the men's confessions had been fabricated.

Silcott received compensation of £17,000 for his wrongful conviction. Two of the investigating police officers were prosecuted for fabricating evidence but were acquitted in 1994. Silcott received a further £50,000 in compensation from the Metropolitan Police in an out-of-court settlement which ended a civil action against the force for malicious prosecution.

Silcott was convicted in 1979 and sent to prison for six months for his part in a nightclub brawl. His other convictions include murder, burglary, malicious wounding and possession of an offensive weapon. In 1979 he was tried for and acquitted of murder.

In 1989, the London School of Economics Students' Union elected Silcott as Honorary President, as a protest against miscarriages of justice.

Silcott served 18 years' imprisonment for the murder of boxer and nightclub bouncer Tony Smith, for which he was on bail when Blakelock was killed. Silcott claimed that he killed Smith in self-defence after an altercation in which he feared for his life and felt he had no choice but to attack, but was disbelieved by the jury. He was released from Blantyre House Prison in October 2003. Silcott had also served a six-month prison sentence for assault in a nightclub prior to his conviction for the murder of Smith.

In 2005, the police recruited Silcott to run a youth centre on the Broadwater Farm Estate, in a bid to reduce youth crime in the area.

In March 2007, he was found guilty of theft from shops for a second time since his release from prison.

References

External links
Interview (The Observer, 18 January 2004)
Silcott in bid to cut youth crime (BBC News, 16 August 2005)

1959 births
20th-century English criminals
21st-century English criminals
British people convicted of burglary
British people convicted of theft
British people of Montserratian descent
Criminals from London
English people convicted of assault
English people convicted of murder
Living people
Overturned convictions in England
People acquitted of murder
People convicted of murder by England and Wales
Place of birth missing (living people)